John Charles Ryle (10 May 1816 – 10 June 1900) was an English evangelical Anglican bishop. He was the first Anglican bishop of Liverpool.

Life
He was the eldest son of John Ryle, private banker, of Park House, Macclesfield, M.P. for Macclesfield 1833–7, and Susanna, daughter of Charles Hurt of Wirksworth, Derbyshire. He was born at Macclesfield on 10 May 1816.

He was educated at Eton and the University of Oxford, where his career was unusually distinguished. He was Fell exhibitioner at Christ Church, from which foundation he matriculated on 15 May 1834. He was Craven scholar in 1836, graduated B.A. in 1838, having been placed in the first-class in literæ humaniores in the preceding year, and proceeded M.A. in 1871. He was created D.D. by diploma on 4 May 1880.

Ryle left the university with the intention of standing for parliament on the first opportunity, but was unable to do so because of his father's bankruptcy. He took holy orders (1841–42) and became curate at Exbury, Hampshire. In 1843, he was preferred to the rectory of St Thomas, Winchester, which he exchanged in the following year for that of Helmingham, Suffolk. The latter living he retained until 1861, when he resigned it for the vicarage of Stradbroke in the same county. The restoration of Stradbroke church was due to his initiative. In 1869, he was made rural dean of Hoxne, and in 1872 honorary canon of Norwich. He was select preacher at Cambridge in 1873 and the following year, and at Oxford from 1874 to 1876, and in 1879 and the following year. In 1880, he was designated dean of Salisbury, and at once, 19 April, advanced to the newly created see of Liverpool, which he ably administered until his death at Lowestoft on 10 June 1900. He is buried at All Saints Church, Childwall, Liverpool.

Family
He married three times but his first two wives died young. The first marriage was on 29 October 1845, to Matilda Charlotte Louisa, daughter of John Pemberton Plumptre, of Fredville, Kent. The second, in March 1850, was to Jessy, daughter of John Walker of Crawfordton, Dumfriesshire. The third, on 24 October 1861, was to Henrietta, daughter of Lieutenant-colonel William Legh Clowes of Broughton Old Hall, Lancashire. He had a daughter by his first wife, and four other children by his second wife Jessy. His second son, Herbert Edward Ryle also a clergyman, became successively Bishop of Exeter, Bishop of Winchester and Dean of Westminster.

Legacy

Ryle was a strong supporter of the evangelical school and a critic of ritualism. He was a writer, pastor and an evangelical preacher. Among his longer works are Christian Leaders of the Eighteenth Century (1869), Expository Thoughts on the Gospels (7 vols, 1856–69), and Principles for Churchmen (1884). Ryle was described as having a commanding presence and vigorous in advocating his principles albeit with a warm disposition. He was also credited with having success in evangelizing the blue collar community. He was a strong believer in the return of the Jews to their own land as being prophesied in the Bible and thus was part of the movement that led to the Balfour Declaration.

Published works

The Cross: A Call to the Fundamentals of Religion (1852)
Expository Thoughts on Matthew, (HTM, LibriVox audio)
Expository Thoughts on Mark, (HTM, LibriVox audio)
Expository Thoughts on Luke, (HTM), Vol. 1, Vol. 2, LibriVox audio: Vol. 1, Vol. 2
Expository Thoughts on John, (HTM) Vol. 1, Vol. 2, Vol. 3, LibriVox audio: Vol. 1, Vol. 2, Vol. 3
Coming Events And Present Duties, and Prophecy, (1867) Now published as Are You Ready for the End of Time?
Shall We Know One Another, (1870)
Knots Untied, (1877)
Holiness: Its Nature, Hindrances, Difficulties and Roots, (1877, enlarged 1879), (HTM)
Practical Religion: Being Plain Papers on the Daily Duties, Experience, Dangers, and Privileges of Professing Christians, (1878)
Higher Criticism: Some Thoughts on Modern Theories about the Old Testament (1880)
Simplicity in Preaching, (1882)
Upper Room: Being a Few Truths for the Times, (1887)
The Duties of Parents, (1888)
From Old Times: or Protestant Facts And Men], (1890) (partially reprinted as [https://archive.org/details/fiveenglishrefor00ryle/page/n1/mode/2up Five English Reformers)
 Bible Inspiration: Its Reality And Nature (1877)Christian Leaders of the Last Century (1873)Tracts and Other WorksIndependently published:

 Warnings to the Churches'' (1967)

References

Attribution

External links

Biography, Tracts, and Articles on or by JC Ryle .
 
 
 
 .
 .
 .
 .
 .
 .  A famous Christmas sermon relating  to the question of who is a Christian.
 .
 .
 
 .
 

1816 births
1900 deaths
Sportspeople from Macclesfield
People educated at Eton College
Alumni of Christ Church, Oxford
Anglican bishops of Liverpool
Critics of the Catholic Church
19th-century English Anglican priests
English evangelicals
Evangelical Anglican bishops
English cricketers
Oxford University cricketers
Deans of Salisbury
English cricketers of 1826 to 1863
People from Stradbroke